Karani, including the Koresh-e Rostam dialect, is a moribund Northwestern Iranian language closely related to Talysh.

References 

Northwestern Iranian languages